Klein River is a river in the Western Cape province of South Africa. The river mouth is located at Hermanus. Its tributaries include the Karringmelk River. It falls within the Drainage system G.

See also 
 List of rivers of South Africa
 List of drainage basins of South Africa
 Water Management Areas

Rivers of the Western Cape